Atle Haglund  (born 10 April 1964)  is a Norwegian ice sledge hockey player and ice sledge speed racer. He lost both his legs in a traffic accident at the age of eight.

During the 1984 Winter Paralympics, Haglund participated in four disciplines of ice sledge speed racing. He won a gold in the 1,000 meter, and a silver in the 100 meter. During the 1988 Winter Paralympics, he again participated in four disciplines, and won a bronze in 1,500 meter. During the 1994 Winter Paralympics, he participated in both ice sledge speed racing and ice sledge hockey. He took a gold in 1,000 meter and 1,500, as well as a silver in 500 meter and the men's ice hockey tournament. He participated again in the ice sledge hockey at the following three Winter Paralympics, winning a gold in 1998, and a silver in 2002 and 2006.

References

Paralympic sledge hockey players of Norway
Norwegian sledge hockey players
Paralympic ice sledge speed racers of Norway
Ice sledge speed racers at the 1984 Winter Paralympics
Ice sledge speed racers at the 1988 Winter Paralympics
Ice sledge speed racers at the 1994 Winter Paralympics
Ice sledge hockey players at the 1994 Winter Paralympics
Ice sledge hockey players at the 1998 Winter Paralympics
Ice sledge hockey players at the 2002 Winter Paralympics
Ice sledge hockey players at the 2006 Winter Paralympics
Paralympic gold medalists for Norway
Paralympic silver medalists for Norway
Paralympic bronze medalists for Norway
Living people
Medalists at the 1984 Winter Paralympics
Medalists at the 1988 Winter Paralympics
Medalists at the 1994 Winter Paralympics
Medalists at the 1998 Winter Paralympics
Medalists at the 2002 Winter Paralympics
Medalists at the 2006 Winter Paralympics
1964 births
Paralympic medalists in ice sledge speed racing
20th-century Norwegian people
21st-century Norwegian people